Somang Presbyterian Church is a  Presbyterian Church of Korea (PCK) church located in Gangnam-gu in Seoul, South Korea. It is considered one of the largest churches in South Korea. The former South Korean President, Lee Myung-bak, also serves as the elder of this church.

Relationship with the Lee Myung-bak Government
The Somang Presbyterian Church is Lee Myung-bak's main source of socio-political connections. Many prominent figures of the Lee Myung-bak government attend the Somang Presbyterian Church.

Controversies
On January 3, 2011, three ministers fought violently inside the church allegedly due to their conflicting theological differences. This resulted in a facial injury to the head minister. It is later revealed that the two subordinate ministers were threatened that they couldn't assign time slots to their service. There had been two more violent incidents before this.

Choi Seung-ho, the producer of MBC's investigative journalist program called PD Notebook was suddenly replaced by another staff on early March 2011 after investigating the Somang Presbyterian Church. There were concerns whether the South Korean President Lee Myung-bak was involved in this censorship-like action. The staffs from MBC criticized this action as "an intention to purge the journalists who are pursuing critical investigative journalism" and took actions against it. The producer of KBS's investigative journalist program called Chujeok 60 Bun was also later found out that was suddenly appointed to the International Department to stop any investigation towards the church.

On April 8, 2011, a former subordinate minister of Somang Presbyterian Church was arrested for banking fraud.

Park Tae-kyu, the representative lobbyist of Busan Savings Bank, once affiliated with the Somang Presbyterian Church. Park Tae-kyu was responsible for bribing the now-resigned Senior Secretary of Public Relations of the Blue House, Kim Du-woo.

References

External links
  Somang Presbyterian Church Official Website
 Somang Presbyterian Church Official Website
 

Churches in Seoul
Buildings and structures in Gangnam District
Presbyterian churches in Seoul